Neeyamur Rashid Rahul, also known as Niamur Rashid, (born 1 January 1975) is a former Bangladeshi cricketer who played in two One Day Internationals in 1999. Post retirement from cricket he became a match referee.

Playing career
In 1999, he made his ODI debut against Zimbabwe.
He was also a part of the playing XI of Bangladesh's famous victory over Pakistan in 1999 Cricket World Cup, which was his last match in international cricket.

Career as a match referee
After retiring from cricket, he became a match referee. He first officiated as match referee in 2020 Nepal Tri-Nation Series, officiating all 6 matches of the tournament.

Due to COVID-19 pandemic, ICC rescinded its decision to use neutral match referee, instead allowing local match officials to officiate in international cricket. and subsequesntly, he was named as the match referee for all matches played between Bangladesh and West Indies in 2020-21. Thus, he became the first Bangladeshi match referee to officiate in test matches.

In January 2023, he was named as one of the match referees for the 2023 ICC Under-19 Women's T20 World Cup.

References

External links
 

1975 births
Living people
Bangladesh One Day International cricketers
Bangladeshi cricketers
Dhaka Division cricketers
Dhaka Metropolis cricketers
Cricket match referees
People from Pabna District